Scott Lake is a lake of northern Saskatchewan and the Northwest Territories of Canada.

See also
List of lakes of Saskatchewan

References
Statistics Canada
Anglersatlas.com

Lakes of Saskatchewan